The 2003 Ondo State gubernatorial election occurred on April 19, 2003. PDP's Olusegun Agagu, a former Deputy Governor to Bamidele Olumilua, won election for a first tenure, defeating Incumbent Governor, AD's Adebayo Adefarati and three other candidates.

Olusegun Agagu emerged winner in the PDP gubernatorial primary election. His running mate was Omolade Oluwateru.

Electoral system
The Governor of Ondo State is elected using the plurality voting system.

Results
A total of five candidates registered with the Independent National Electoral Commission to contest in the election. PDP candidate Olusegun Agagu won election for a first tenure, defeating AD Incumbent Governor, Adebayo Adefarati, and three other candidates.

The total number of registered voters in the state was 1,504,181. However, only 63.83% (i.e. 960,080) of registered voters participated in the excerise.

References 

Ondo State gubernatorial elections
Gubernatorial election 2003
Ondo State gubernatorial election